The China Music Awards is a Chinese music awards founded by Channel V in 1994.

References 

Chinese music awards